Identification badges of the Uniformed Services of the United States are insignia worn by service members conducting special duties, many of which can be awarded as permanent decorations if those duties are performed successfully.  There are a few identification badges that are awarded to all services (such as the Presidential Service Badge), others are specific to a uniform service (such as the U.S. Army's Drill Sergeant Identification Badge).  The Office of the President and Vice President and department/service headquarters badges are permanent decorations for those who successfully serve in those assignments.  Some of the service level identification badges can be permanent decorations and others are only worn by a service member while performing specific duties, such as the Military Police Badge.

Command insignia/badges are another form of identification badge used to identify an officer or non-commissioned officer who is/was in command or in-charge of a unit.  If the service member performs their leadership duties successfully, the command insignia/badge they wear can become a permanent uniform decoration regardless of their next assignment.

The following is a list of identification badges currently in use by the uniformed services:

Executive Branch

Department of Defense

U.S. Army

U.S. Air Force

U.S. Space Force

U.S. Navy

U.S. Marine Corps

Department of Homeland Security

U.S. Coast Guard

Department of Health and Human Services

U.S. Public Health Service Commissioned Corps

Department of Commerce

U.S. National Oceanic and Atmospheric Administration Commissioned Corps

See also
Military badges of the United States
Awards and decorations of the Public Health Service
Awards and decorations of the National Oceanic and Atmospheric Administration
Obsolete badges of the United States military
United States Army branch insignia
List of United States Army careers
List of United States Marine Corps MOS
United States Navy staff corps
List of United States Navy ratings
Air Force Specialty Code
List of United States Coast Guard ratings

References